The Sligo county hurling team represents Sligo in hurling and is governed by Sligo GAA, the county board of the Gaelic Athletic Association. The team competes in the Christy Ring Cup and the National Hurling League. It formerly competed in the abolished Connacht Senior Hurling Championship, finishing as runner-up in 1900 and 1906.

Sligo's home ground is Markievicz Park, Sligo. The team's manager is Padraig Mannion.

The team has never won the Connacht Senior Championship, the All-Ireland Senior Championship or the National League.

History
Sligo is traditionally a weak team at senior level. Despite this, the hurlers have attained noticeably more success than their football counterparts, with the county's most notable early achievement being 

Sligo won the All-Ireland Minor 'C' Hurling Championship in August 1986, defeating Tyrone by four points at Croke Park.

Sligo won the 2005 National Hurling League Division 3 title.

Sligo, under the management of Mickey Galvin, won its first All-Ireland hurling title at senior level by defeating Louth in the 2008 Nicky Rackard Cup Final. The team did not achieve promotion however, losing a play-off to Roscommon.

The under-16 team won the 2012 All-Ireland "C" hurling title by defeating Tyrone at the Monaghan Centre of Excellence.

2018 had both senior and minor teams bring national silverware back to the Land of the Shells. Sligo won a senior All-Ireland title for the first time since 2008. The men, jointly managed by Daithí Hand and Darragh Cox in their first senior hurling management role, defeated Lancashire in the 2018 Lory Meagher Cup final, with a last-minute Kevin Gilmartin goal (his third of the game) sealing the victory. Benny Kenny's under-17 squad, a few weeks later, defeated Donegal to become All-Ireland Celtic Challenge Cup Champions in the Michael Feery Cup, also defeating Mayo, Roscommon and others along the way.

The county team won a second consecutive senior title in 2019 under Hand, Peter Galvin and coach Colum O'Meara. Having been promoted to the Nicky Rackard Cup, the team topped Group 2, eliminating favourite Mayo, in a drawn game after beating Tyrone and Louth in previous games.

Following on from a 2–21 to 2–17 victory over Warwickshire at Celtic Park, Sligo advanced to the 2019 Nicky Rackard Cup final at Croke Park.

Facing a heavily tipped Armagh side, Sligo became champions with a Conor Griffin point, a Gerard O'Kelly-Lynch goal and a 73rd-minute point by young substitute Kieran Prior. The scoreline at the game's conclusion was 2–14 to 2–13; though the team was four points behind Armagh as the game entered injury-time, the two lates points and the goal meant Sligo secured a one-point victory. James Weir, at 19 years of age and the youngest ever All-Ireland winning captain, lifted aloft the Nicky Rackard Cup 

Hand and fellow management team member Peter Galvin tendered their resignations on the evening of 14 September 2020, less than one month before the team was scheduled to contest a National League final and make its debut in the Christy Ring Cup. Confusion over efforts to register two players from Galway with Sligo heritage and the involvement of one of their coaches with a club, unbeknownst to Hand and Galvin, were cited as partly contributing to this unexpected decision. The county board did not report their departures until 20 September. The coach, later named as Colum O'Meara, then applied (unsuccessfully) to become Hand's successor; O'Meara, a native of Killimor, County Galway, had joined the Sligo set-up as coach ahead of the 2019 season after parting ways with Longford.

Padraig Mannion ultimately succeeded Hand as Sligo manager in late 2020.

List of Seasons

Season-by-season record

Current panel

INJ Player has had an injury which has affected recent involvement with the county team.
RET Player has since retired from the county team.
WD Player has since withdrawn from the county team due to a non-injury issue.

Current management team
Appointed 13 December 2020:
Manager: Padraig Mannion
Management team: Donal Tully, Declan Molloy, Darragh Cox

Managerial history

Mickey Galvin:  2008, e.g. Lory Meagher Cup (see The Irish Times source)
Daithí Hand and Darragh Small:  2018
Daithí Hand:  2019–20

Padraig Mannion: 2020–

Players

Notable players

Records
Paul Seevers would be a prominent hurler for his county for more the 20 years. Seevers won the 2008 Nicky Rackard Cup with his county, three Railway Cups with Connacht and represented Ireland against Scotland in the 2003 Shinty-Hurling International Series.
Keith Raymond
Gerard O'Kelly-Lynch also represented Ireland, in his case in 2018.

Champions 15
Lory Meagher Cup (2015)
Keith Raymond
Gerard O'Kelly-Lynch
Lory Meagher Cup (2016)
Keith Raymond
Champions 15 (2019)
Keith Raymond
Gerard O'Kelly-Lynch

Honours

National
All-Ireland Intermediate Hurling Championship/Christy Ring Cup
 Semi-finalists (1): 2021
All-Ireland Junior Hurling Championship/Nicky Rackard Cup
 Winners (2): 2008, 2019

All-Ireland Junior B Hurling Championship/Lory Meagher Cup
 Winners (1): 2018
 Runners-up (2): 2015, 2016
National Hurling League Division 3
 Winners (2) 2004, 2021 
National Hurling League Division 3B
 Winners (1): 2020
National Hurling League Division 4
 Winners (1): 2009

Provincial
Connacht Senior Hurling Championship
 Runners-up (2): 1900, 1906
Connacht Junior Hurling Championship
 Winners (3): 1968, 1973, 2019
 Runners-up (7): 1929, 1930, 1954, 1963 1967, 1976, 2004

Head-to-head record

Head-to-head Championship record 
Every championship result since the restructuring of the hurling championships in 2005.

  

As of 17 August 2022.

Counties Sligo has never played in the championship since 2005

References

 
County hurling teams